Viktorija Ni (born December 30, 1991) is a Latvian-American chess player. She was awarded the title of Woman International Master (WIM) by FIDE in 2010.

Chess career
Viktorija Ni was taught to play chess at seven years old by her mother, Polina, and was trained by Jānis Klovāns. She won the Latvian women's championship of rapid chess in 2004 and 2005. In 2009 Ni was Latvian youth champion and European rapid champion in the girls under 18 category. Ni earned the title of Woman FIDE Master (WFM) in 2007 and that of Woman International Master (WIM) in 2010. She achieved her final norm required for the title WIM at the 19th Chicago Open. Ni played for the Latvian team at the Women's Chess Olympiad in 2008 and 2010, and the Four Nations Chess Challenge in 2008.

She transferred national federations from Latvia to the United States in 2011. Ni has represented the United States at the Women's World Team Chess Championship in 2013 and 2015. She finished in fourth place at the U.S. Women's Chess Championship in 2012 and 2015. She competed in the Women's World Chess Championship in 2017.

Personal life
Ni is married to chess grandmaster Yury Shulman. She lives in New York City where she works as a chess coach.

References

External links
 
 
 
 
 

1991 births
Living people
Chess Woman International Masters
American female chess players
Latvian female chess players
Chess Olympiad competitors
Sportspeople from Riga
21st-century American women